The College Scorecard is an online tool, created by the United States government, for consumers to compare the cost and value of higher education institutions in the United States. At launch, it displayed data in five areas: cost, graduation rate, employment rate, average amount borrowed, and loan default rate.

In February 2022, the site was expanded and some data dropped under the Trump Administration was restored. New per-institution data includes post-graduation average income, and percentage of graduates earning more than people with a high school degree.

References

External links 

United States Department of Education
Higher education in the United States
Government services web portals in the United States